Liebeswalzer may refer to:

 Waltz of Love, a 1930 German film directed by Wilhelm Thiele 
 Liebeswalzer (album), a 1985 album by the East German rock band Silly